The MDM Observatory (Michigan-Dartmouth-MIT Observatory; obs. code: 697) is an optical astronomical observatory located adjacent to Kitt Peak National Observatory on Kitt Peak, west of Tucson, Arizona, in the United States. It is owned and operated by the University of Michigan, Dartmouth College, Ohio State University, Columbia University, and Ohio University. The Massachusetts Institute of Technology (MIT) was also part of the operating consortium in the past.

It has two reflecting telescopes, the 2.4-meter (95 inches aperture Hiltner Telescope (since 1986), used for galactic surveys, and the 1.3-meter (50 inch diameter aperture) McGraw–Hill Telescope (since 1975), which was originally located near Ann Arbor, Michigan.

Hiltner Telescope 

The mirror of the 2.4-meter Hiltner Telescope is aluminum-coated Cer-Vit, and usable foci include f/7.5 and f/13.5 Cassegrain foci. The telescope was built in 1986 and the mirrors were re-polished in 1991. It was named after astronomer W. Albert Hiltner (1914-1991).

The Hiltner was one of the telescopes that observed the turn on a nuclear transit, along with the Swift space telescope (aka Neil Gehrels Swift Observatory since 2018) and the Gemini observatory (8 meter ground observatory). The transient event was called PS1-13cbe and was located in the Galaxy SDSS J222153.87+003054.2.

McGraw–Hill Telescope 

The 1.3-meter McGraw-Hill Telescope, with a 1.27-meter clear aperture, is an aluminum-coated Cer-Vit (low thermal expansion glass) telescope. Its usable foci include f/7.5 and f/13.5. The telescope was originally installed at Stinchfield Woods, Michigan in 1969, and moved in 1975 to MDM.

Asteroid 4432 McGraw-Hill 

The asteroid 4432 McGraw-Hill is named after this telescope. It was discovered on March 2, 1981 by Schelte J. Bus at Siding Spring in the course of the UK Schmidt-Caltech Asteroid Survey. On February 18, 1992, the International Astronomical Union officially assigned the name "McGraw-Hill" to the asteroid. The text of the citation, as officially published by IAU Commission 20, is as follows:

Gallery

See also
 List of largest optical telescopes in the 20th century
 List of observatories

References

External links
 MDM Observatory
 Aerial view of observatory
 Kitt Peak Clear Sky Clock Forecasts of observing conditions.

Astronomical observatories in Arizona
Buildings and structures in Pima County, Arizona
Dartmouth College facilities
Kitt Peak National Observatory